The gleaning mouse (Peromyscus spicilegus) is a species of rodent in the family Cricetidae.  It is found only in Mexico.

References

 Baillie, J. 1996.  Peromyscus spicilegus.   2006 IUCN Red List of Threatened Species.   Downloaded on 19 July 2007.
Musser, G. G. and M. D. Carleton. 2005. Superfamily Muroidea. pp. 894–1531 in Mammal Species of the World a Taxonomic and Geographic Reference. D. E. Wilson and D. M. Reeder eds. Johns Hopkins University Press, Baltimore.

Peromyscus
Mammals described in 1897
Taxonomy articles created by Polbot
Endemic fauna of Mexico